Aymen Sfaxi (born 24 April 1995) is a Tunisian professional footballer who plays as right winger for Egyptian Premier League Future FC. He previously played for Étoile Sportive du Sahel.

Club career 
Sfaxi started his career with the youth team of Étoile Sportive du Sahel. He later joined EO Sidi Bouzid on a one-year loan. He returned from the loan and made his debut in the 2016–17 season. In July 2018, he joined Stade Tunisien on a two-year loan deal. He returned and played for Étoile Sportive du Sahel during the 2020–21 season which he ended as the top scorer in the Tunisian Ligue Professionnelle 1.

After emerging top scorer and based on his performances, he became a transfer target to several clubs in Tunisia and Egypt. On 13 September 2021, he joined Egyptian Premier League Future FC on a three-year deal.

International career 
In 2014, Sfaxi was a member of the Tunisia national under-20 team.

Honours 
Individual

 Tunisian Ligue Professionelle 1 Top Goalscorer: 2020–21

References

External links
 
 

Living people
1995 births
Association football forwards
Tunisian footballers
Étoile Sportive du Sahel players
EO Sidi Bouzid players
Stade Tunisien players
Tunisian Ligue Professionnelle 1 players
Tunisian expatriate footballers
Tunisian expatriate sportspeople in Egypt
Tunisia youth international footballers
Future FC (Egypt) players